Si Somdet is a district (amphoe) in Roi Et province, Thailand.

Geography
Neighboring districts are (from the north clockwise): Mueang Roi Et and Chaturaphak Phiman of Roi Et Province; Wapi Pathum, Kae Dam, and Mueang Maha Sarakham of Maha Sarakham province.

History
The district was created on 1 April 1987, when the five tambons, Pho Thong, Si Somdet, Mueang Plueai, Nong Yai, and Suan Chik were split off from Mueang Roi Et district. It was upgraded to a full district on 4 July 1994.

Administration
The district is divided into eight sub-districts (tambons), which are further subdivided into 82 villages (mubans). There are no municipal (thesaban) areas; there are eight tambon administrative organizations (TAO).

References

External links
amphoe.com (in Thai)

Si Somdet